Make a Move is the fifth studio album by American singer-songwriter Gavin DeGraw. It was released on October 15, 2013, in the United States by RCA Records

For the album DeGraw worked with several producers, including busbee, Martin Johnson, Ryan Tedder, Butch Walker, Benny Blanco, and Kevin Rudolf.

Singles
The album's first single "Best I Ever Had" was released on June 18, 2013. It was written by DeGraw and Martin Johnson of Boys Like Girls. The single reached a peak position of number 28 on Billboard'''s  Adult Contemporary chart. It was covered by George Horga Jr. and Juhi in The Battle rounds at the fifth season of The Voice''.

Track listing

Notes
 signifies an additional producer
 signifies a vocal producer

Charts

Release history

Personnel
Smith Carlson - Engineer

References

External links

2013 albums
Gavin DeGraw albums
RCA Records albums